is a city located in Hiroshima Prefecture, Japan. It was originally the capital of the former Bingo Province. The city was founded on March 31, 1954. Fuchū, Tokyo became a city the following day. As of May 1, 2011, population data, the city has an estimated population of 43,932, with 17,602 households and a population density of 224.47 people per km². The total area is 195.71 km². On April 1, 2004, the town of Jōge (from Kōnu District) was merged into Fuchū.

Geography

Climate
Fuchū has a humid subtropical climate (Köppen climate classification Cfa) characterized by cool to mild winters and hot, humid summers.

Demographics
Per Japanese census data, the population of Fuchū in 2020 is 37,655 people. Fuchū has been conducting censuses since 1960.

References

External links

 Fuchū City official website 

Cities in Hiroshima Prefecture